Nanobots is the sixteenth studio album from Brooklyn-based alternative rock group They Might Be Giants. Uncharacteristically for the band, the album's title comes from an album track, as the second track shares a title with the album. The album was released on March 5, 2013 on Idlewild Recordings — the band's independent imprint — with Megaforce Records in the US. The album was also separately released on March 8 in Australia through Breakaway Records and on March 11 in Europe, through Lojinx. One week before its physical release, Nanobots was released digitally for streaming in its entirety through the band's SoundCloud, announced by Rolling Stone. Prior to this, "Call You Mom", "Black Ops" and "Lost My Mind" were released through the advance digital Nanobots EP in January 2013. The EP, released through Amazon.com and iTunes, was met with fairly positive responses.

Production
The album, which contains  25 tracks and runs approximately 45 minutes, was recorded in Manhattan and produced by Patrick Dillett. The relatively short run time is accounted for by the fact that the album includes many of what band member John Flansburgh describes as "extremely short songs". Flansburgh adds that "...the songs kind of stand alone. When you listen to the album alone, it has this manic pacing to it with the short songs. It makes for a different kind of listening experience." John Linnell commented that these songs were naturally written as short songs to avoid over-populating them with unnecessary verses and choruses. This distinguishes them from the "Fingertips" suite of songs under one minute long on Apollo 18, as those songs were written specifically with brevity in mind, and were described by Linnell as having been "hyper-arranged".

Artwork
Artwork for Nanobots was designed by Paul Sahre, using collages by artist Sam Weber. Throughout the album artwork, four of Weber's collages are used: Ingres, Hansel, Jester(clown), and Blue Beard 2. The same style was used for the promotional Nanobots EP. The first of these collages, Ingres (prominently featuring the painting The Princesse de Broglie by Jean-Auguste-Dominique Ingres), is used as the album's cover art. The collages were described by Christopher R. Weingarten for Spin as "Max-Ernst-gone-Saw".

Promotion 
Before the release of the full album, two tracks from the album were released digitally. "Call You Mom" and "You're on Fire" were made available through Rolling Stone and Stereogum, respectively, in the winter preceding the album's release. A full week before the album's official release date, the entire album was also uploaded to TMBG's SoundCloud. Further emphasizing the availability of free music via the Internet, the band also released a mobile app for iOS and Android devices. The app, which is updated daily, allows the user to stream five They Might Be Giants tracks at a time.

They Might Be Giants played an international tour in support of Nanobots. The tour included shows in North America and Australia. The band also performed in the United Kingdom and Germany during the tour.

Reception 

Nanobots has garnered generally positive reviews from critics. It has received an aggregate score of 69 (based on 8 reviews) on Metacritic. Both Heather Phares, writing for Allmusic, and Steven Arroyo for Consequence of Sound indicated approval of the album's selection of tracks that run under a minute long. Reviewers also found Nanobots to be similar to some of the band's earlier material. In particular, the album was compared to Apollo 18, which featured "Fingertips", a series of 21 songs, almost all under 30 seconds long. Longtime music critic Robert Christgau described "Tesla" as "strong as‑-and more soulful than‑-anything in their catalogue", and also cited "Black Ops" and "Replicant" as highlights.

The album debuted at #57 on the Billboard 200. The album also spent a few weeks on the CMJ Radio 200 chart, peaking at #13 in April.

Track listing

Australian bonus CD 
The Australian CD, released through Breakaway Records, was packaged with a bonus disc containing seven live tracks.

Personnel
They Might Be Giants
John Linnell – songwriting, vocals, accordion, keyboards, bass clarinet, contra-alto clarinet, saxophones, programming
John Flansburgh – songwriting, vocals, guitar, keyboards, programming
Backing band
Marty Beller – drums
Dan Miller – guitar, piano on 10
Danny Weinkauf – bass guitar

Additional musicians
Stan Harrison – saxophone on 6, saxophones, clarinets and flute on 20
Jon Graboff – mandolin on 13
Jedediah Parish – vocals on 14
Chris Thompson – vibraphone on 19, 24
Robin Goldwasser – vocals on 1, 9, 16, 24

Production
Patrick Dillett – producer
Jon Altschuler – engineer
Paul Sahre – graphic design
Sam Weber – artwork

See also
Nikola Tesla in popular culture

References

External links
Nanobots on This Might Be A Wiki, a They Might Be Giants MediaWiki

They Might Be Giants albums
2013 albums
Idlewild Recordings albums
Albums produced by Pat Dillett
Megaforce Records albums
Lojinx albums